Clifton Beach is a coastal suburb located approximately 25 km southeast of Hobart on the South Arm Peninsula on the outskirts of Hobart, Tasmania, Australia.  It is part of the City of Clarence, and is a popular surfing location.

Clifton Beach Surf Life Saving Club was established in 1963. This section of the club is one part of two, the other half being at Kingston Beach on the western shore.

The entire beach is backed by a coastal reserve, which incorporates coastal dunes behind the central and eastern part of the beach. The now vegetated dunes have transgressed up to 300 m inland rising to more than 20 m, with dense vegetation behind, then the shallow southern shores of circular Pipe Clay Lagoon. The beach is bordered by 54 m high Cape Deslacs in the east and 50 m high rocky cliffs in the west that run south for 3.5 km rising to 100 m high at Cape Contrariety. The beach is 2.1 km long and faces south-southeast into Storm Bay exposing it to all southerly swell. Waves average 1-1.5 m and maintain a moderately steep beach fronted by a continuous bar which is cut by rips every 200 m during and following high waves, with permanent rips against the rocks at each end. It is considered by some as the most dangerous beach in Tasmania. The beach is so dangerous because of its perfect barreling waves which makes even the toughest locals scared.

References

External links
 Clifton Beach WebCam

Beaches of Tasmania
South Arm Peninsula
Localities of City of Clarence